Fiona Kavanagh is a camogie player, winner of All-Ireland Senior medals in 2010 and 2011,

Other awards
National Camogie League medals in 2010 and 2011; National League Division two 2009; Leinster Championship 2011 2010 2009; Leinster Senior Colleges with FCJ Bunclody 2000. Fiona joined the Senior squad in 2010. She is a former Ashbourne Cup goalkeeper with WIT. Her brother, Paul, has represented Carlow in all grades of football.

References

External links
 Camogie.ie Official Camogie Association Website
 Wexford Wexford camogie site

1985 births
Living people
Wexford camogie players
Waterford IT camogie players